The men's pentathlon event was part of the track and field athletics programme at the 1924 Summer Olympics. It was the third and last appearance of a pentathlon at the Olympics. The competition was held on Monday, July 7, 1924. Thirty pentathletes from 17 nations competed.

Records

Robert LeGendre set a new world record in long jump during this competition. He improved the old records:

Results

Long jump

The long jump was the first event and started at 2:00 p.m.

Group 1

Group 2

Javelin throw

The javelin throw was the second event and started at 2:45 p.m.

Group 1

Group 2

200 metres

The third event was the 200 metres. The heats started at 3:45 p.m.

Heat 1

Heat 2

Heat 3

Heat 4

Heat 5

Heat 6

Heat 7

Heat 8

Heat 9

Heat 10

Standings after three events

After these three events only the top twelve competitors were allowed to participate in the following discus throw contest.

After the determination of the twelve competitors who will participate in the next event all other results from the non-qualified pentathletes were deleted. This gave the following order and current standing at this point of the competition:

Eero Lehtonen and Elemér Somfay later gold and silver medalists tied in fourth place after three events. The biggest winner of the deletion of the results from the non-qualified competitors was Robert LeGendre. He came up from fourth and second place. The biggest loss had Denis Duigan who came from ninth back to eleventh.

Discus throw

The discus throw was the fourth event and started at 4:30 p.m.

The leader after three events Mort Kaer was able to finish only in tenth place. While Eero Lehtonen, Olympic champion in pentathlon at the 1920 Games, won the discus throw competition.

After the fourth event again only the best six pentathletes from the overall standings advanced to the last contest. Mort Kaer who only managed to finish in tenth place in the discus throw came back to fourth place overall - enough to participate in the final 1500 metres run. Brutus Hamilton who finished third in the discus throw did not improve his seventh place overall and failed to qualify for the 1500 metres run. So the first six places were unchanged and three Finns, two US-Americans, and one Hungarian started in the final.

At this point of the competition the results from the non-qualified competitors were not deleted so the results stand for the final event.

1500 metres

The 1500 metres run was the fifth and final event and started at 5:15 p.m.

Final standings

The medal ranks were unchanged after the 1500 metres run. Eero Lehtonen was able to win his second gold medal in Olympic pentathlon. He also became the last Olympic champion in pentathlon as this event was discontinued. The new world record holder in long jump Robert LeGendre finished third and won the bronze medal. He would have won the gold medal if this contest were scored by points tables. But his ninth place in the javelin throw pushed him back. And he did not participate in the Olympic long jump event held the next day, because he did not compete in this event at the US Olympic trials.

References

External links
Olympic Report
 

Men's pentathlon
1924